The 1983 Asian Men's Volleyball Championship was the third staging of the Asian Men's Volleyball Championship, a quadrennial international volleyball tournament organised by the Asian Volleyball Confederation (AVC) with Japan Volleyball Association (JVA). The tournament was held in Tokyo, Japan from 23 November to 1 December 1983.

Preliminary round

Pool A

|}
  Withdrew

|}

Pool B

|}

|}

Final round

Classification 9th–11th

|}

|}

Classification 5th–8th

|}

|}

Classification 1st–4th

|}

|}

Final standing

References
Results

Asian Men's Championship
V
Asian Men's Volleyball Championship
Asian Men's Volleyball Championship
Asian Men's Volleyball Championship
Asian men's volleyball championships
V

http://todor66.com/volleyball/Asia/Men_1983.html